Ranelli is an Italian surname. Notable people with the surname include:

Lorenzo Ranelli (born 1996), Italian footballer
Sam Ranelli (1920–1999), American jazz drummer

See also
Manelli
Ramelli

Italian-language surnames